Sweet piquanté pepper is a cultivar of Capsicum baccatum grown in the Limpopo province of South Africa.

See also
 Peppadew, a brand known for selling pickled sweet piquanté pepper products.
 Pimiento, a similar looking, larger pepper from the Capsicum annuum species.

References

Capsicum cultivars
Chili peppers
Jamaican cuisine
Spanish words and phrases